Parchin (also Romanized as Pārchīn; also known as Mojtame‘-e Maskūnī-ye Pārchīn) is a village in Hesar-e Amir Rural District, in the Central District of Pakdasht County, Tehran Province, Iran. At the 2006 census, its population was 4,111, in 1,186 families.  Nearby is the Parchin military site.

References 

Populated places in Pakdasht County